The Harding Tomb is the burial location of the 29th President of the United States, Warren G. Harding and First Lady Florence Kling Harding. It is located in Marion, Ohio. Also known as the Harding Memorial, it was the last of the elaborate presidential tombs.

Construction
Shortly after Harding died in office, the Harding Memorial Association formed to raise money for a memorial site in honor of the late president. The association ultimately received $978,000 in donations from more than one million people across the country, as well as contributions from several European nations. Among the list of contributors from the United States were an estimated 200,000 school children, who donated pennies towards the memorial. The tomb is located in Marion, Ohio, at the southeast corner of Vernon Heights Boulevard and Delaware Avenue, just south of Marion Cemetery.

Architecture
Construction began in 1926 and finished in the early winter of 1927. It is designed in the style of a circular Greek temple with Doric order marble columns.

The structure is unroofed (peribolus), in the style of some Greek temples in which the center (Hypaethros) was open to the sky and without a roof (medium autem sub diva est sine tecto). The open design honors the Hardings' wishes that they be buried outside, and is covered in ivy and other plantings.

Burials
At their deaths, the bodies of the Hardings were entombed in the Marion Cemetery Receiving Vault.  Once the Harding Memorial was completed in 1927, the bodies were reinterred in the Memorial's sarcophagus and it was sealed.  Because Harding's reputation was damaged by personal controversies and presidential scandals, the Harding Memorial was not officially dedicated until 1931 when President Herbert Hoover presided.

Dedication 
On June 16, 1931, President Herbert Hoover gave a speech at the dedication ceremony of the Warren G. Harding memorial.  The following are excerpts from Hoover's eulogy:

Oversight

The Harding Memorial Association transferred ownership of the Harding Memorial to the Ohio Historical Society (OHS) in the 1980s. OHS undertook a restoration in the mid-1980s and began to refer to the site as the Harding Tomb, a better description of its function.

Following a reorganization, the Ohio Historical Society transferred day-to-day management of the memorial, and the Harding Home, to Marion Technical College (MTC) from 2011–2019.  This arrangement reduced OHS's administrative burden while allowing MTC to attend to the site. OHS retained ownership and co-ordinated with MTC on major site issues.  However, OHS reclaimed day-to-day management in 2019 in conjunction with the new Harding Presidential Center that was being constructed in Marion.

The memorial is the last of the elaborate presidential tombs, a trend that began with the burial of President Abraham Lincoln in his tomb in Springfield, Illinois. Since President Calvin Coolidge, Harding's successor, presidents have chosen burial plot designs that are simpler or combined those with their library sites.

See also
 List of burial places of presidents and vice presidents of the United States
 Presidential memorials in the United States

References

External links

 Ohio History Connection Harding Memorial and Tomb Information

Memorial
Harding Memorial
Tombs of presidents of the United States
Henry Hornbostel buildings
Buildings and structures completed in 1927
Buildings and structures in Marion, Ohio
Ohio History Connection
Tourist attractions in Marion County, Ohio
National Register of Historic Places in Marion County, Ohio
1927 establishments in Ohio